Caramel ( or ) is an orange-brown confectionery product made by heating a range of sugars. It can be used as a flavoring in puddings and desserts, as a filling in bonbons, or as a topping for ice cream and custard.

As the sugar heats, the molecules break down and re-form into compounds with a characteristic colour and flavour.

A variety of candies, desserts, toppings, and confections are made with caramel: brittles, nougats, pralines, flan, crème brûlée, crème caramel, and caramel apples. Ice creams sometimes are flavored with or contain swirls of caramel.

Etymology

The English word comes from French caramel, borrowed from Spanish caramelo (18th century), itself possibly from Portuguese caramelo. Most likely that comes from Late Latin calamellus 'sugar cane', a diminutive of calamus 'reed, cane', itself from Greek κάλαμος. Less likely, it comes from a Medieval Latin cannamella, from canna 'cane' + mella 'honey'. Finally, some dictionaries connect it to an Arabic kora-moħalláh 'ball of sweet'.

Sauce
Caramel sauce is made by mixing caramelized sugar with cream.  Depending on the intended application, additional ingredients such as butter, fruit purees, liquors, or vanilla can be used. Caramel sauce is used in a range of desserts, especially as a topping for ice cream. When it is used for crème caramel or flan, it is known as clear caramel and only contains caramelized sugar and water. Butterscotch sauce is made with brown sugar, butter, and cream. Traditionally, butterscotch is a hard candy more in line with a toffee.

Candy

Caramel candy, or "caramels", and sometimes called "toffee" (though this also refers to other types of candy), is a soft, dense, chewy candy made by boiling a mixture of milk or cream, sugar(s), glucose, butter, and vanilla (or vanilla flavoring). The sugar and glucose are heated separately to reach ; the cream and butter are then added which cools the mixture.  The mixture is then stirred and reheated until it reaches .  Upon completion of cooking, vanilla or any additional flavorings and salt are added.  Adding the vanilla or flavorings earlier would result in them burning off at the high temperatures.  Adding salt earlier in the process would result in inverting the sugars as they cooked.

Alternatively, all ingredients may be cooked together.  In this procedure, the mixture is not heated above the firm ball stage, so that caramelization of the milk occurs. This temperature is not high enough to caramelize sugar and this type of candy is often called milk caramel or cream caramel.
Even though caramel candy is sometimes called "toffee" and is also compared with butterscotch, there is a difference. While toffee and butterscotch are more closely related than caramel, they do have most of the same ingredients. However, the difference is that toffee and butterscotch uses molasses or brown sugar while caramel uses white sugar. They are also cooked at different temperatures and they each have their own cooking techniques that makes them unique in taste and shape.

Salting
The salted caramel was popularized in 1977 by the French pastry chef Henri Le Roux in Quiberon, Brittany, in the form of a salted butter caramel with crushed nuts (caramel au beurre salé), using Breton demi-sel butter. It was named the "Best confectionery in France" (Meilleur Bonbon de France) at the Paris Salon International de la Confiserie in 1980. Le Roux registered the trademark "CBS" (caramel au beurre salé) the year after.

In the late 1990s, the Parisian pastry chef Pierre Hermé introduced his salted butter and caramel macaroons and, by 2000, high-end chefs started adding a bit of salt to caramel and chocolate dishes. In 2008 it entered the mass market, when Häagen-Dazs and Starbucks started selling it.

Originally used in desserts, the confection has seen wide use elsewhere, including in hot chocolate and spirits such as vodka. Its popularity may come from its effects on the reward systems of the human brain, resulting in "hedonic escalation".

Colouring

Caramel colouring, a dark, bitter liquid, is the highly concentrated product of near total caramelization, used commercially as food and beverage colouring, e.g., in cola.

Chemistry

Caramelization is the removal of water from a sugar, proceeding to isomerization and polymerization of the sugars into various high-molecular-weight compounds. Compounds such as difructose anhydride may be created from the monosaccharides after water loss. Fragmentation reactions result in low-molecular-weight compounds that may be volatile and may contribute to flavor. Polymerization reactions lead to larger-molecular-weight compounds that contribute to the dark-brown color.
Caramel can be produced in so many forms such as, sauce, a chewy candy, or a hard candy because of how much of an ingredient is added and the temperature it is being prepared at.
In modern recipes and in commercial production, glucose (from corn syrup or wheat) or invert sugar is added to prevent crystallization, making up 10%–50% of the sugars by mass. "Wet caramels" made by heating sucrose and water instead of sucrose alone produce their own invert sugar due to thermal reaction, but not necessarily enough to prevent crystallization in traditional recipes.

See also

 Caramel apple, whole apples covered in a layer of caramel
 Caramel corn, popcorn coated in caramel
 Dodol, a caramelized confection made with coconut milk
 Dulce de leche, caramelized, sweetened milk
 Maillard reaction
 Nougat, using egg white rather than milk products
 Tablet, Scottish candy made with condensed milk
 Toffee, a type of confection

References

Amorphous solids
Candy
Food colorings
Glassforming liquids and melts
Toppings

sv:Kola